Grace La Rue (born Stella Parsons; April 23, 1882 – March 13, 1956) was an American actress, singer, and vaudeville headliner.

Early life
Grace La Rue was born Stella Parsons in Kansas City, Missouri, on April 23, 1882, to Lucy L. Parsons.

Career
La Rue began her career as a teenager, working with a traveling tent show. Her later performances included being part of the team Burke and La Rue, with her first husband, Charles Burke. One of their numbers was a minstrel piece titled "Grace La Rue and her Inky Dinks". She soon broke away from the act - and Burke - to appear in musical comedy.

La Rue performed in a number of productions on Broadway debuting in The Tourists in 1906. She also appeared in The Blue Moon (1906), Molly May (1910), Betsy (1911), and the 1907 and 1908 Ziegfeld Follies. In 1909, she married Byron (The Millionaire Kid) Chandler in Bennington, Vermont. The marriage broke up in 1914 when La Rue divorced, alleging that Chandler was unfaithful and that he beat her.

La Rue made her debut as a Vaudeville single act in November 1912 at Poli's in Springfield, Missouri. As part of the act she sang an aria from Madame Butterfly, and a duet with a phonograph recording of Enrico Caruso. Variety gave her a good review commenting that the act gave La Rue the "opportunity to display her Parisian cultivated voice."

La Rue made her debut at the Palace Theatre on August 4, 1913. Her act featured the song "You Made Me Love You (I Didn't Want to Do It)", from the show Honeymoon Express, a musical she had appeared in with Al Jolson. Later that year, she brought her Vaudeville act to Britain, appearing at the London Palace on August 4, 1913.

In 1919, La Rue made her screen debut opposite American stage and film actor Hale Hamilton in the melodrama That's Good. She married Hamilton on May 29, 1920, amid a whirl of controversy surrounding a lawsuit filed by Hamilton's second wife, actress Myrtle Tannehill.

In 1922-1923, La Rue appeared in Irving Berlin's second Music Box Revue at the Music Box Theatre in New York. In 1924, she appeared at the Coliseum in London with Hamilton. For the rest of the decade she worked mainly in the United States alternating between Vaudeville and in musical comedies and revues. One of her last big time appearances was in the 1928 Greenwich Village Follies at the Winter Garden Theatre in New York. She appeared in a 1929 Vitaphone short called Grace La Rue: The International Star of Song. By the early 1930s, she had retired to California, where she made a brief appearance in the 1933 Mae West film She Done Him Wrong.

Grace La Rue died at Peninsula Hospital in Burlingame, California on March 13, 1956.

References

External links

 
 
 Grace LaRue, New York Public Library Digital Gallery photo
Grace La Rue in recording from 1910 singing "Does Anybody Here Know Nancy"
1920 passport photo of Grace La Rue and Hale Hamilton
Broadway photographs (University of South Carolina)

1882 births
1956 deaths
Vaudeville performers
American stage actresses
20th-century American actresses
Ziegfeld girls
20th-century American singers
20th-century American women singers